B72 or B 72 may refer to:
 Bundesstraße 72, a German road
 Sicilian Defense, Dragon Variation, according to the Encyclopaedia of Chess Openings 
 Sutton Coldfield in the list of postal districts in the United Kingdom
 Barnard 72, the Snake Nebula

B-72 may refer to :
 ADM-20 Quail, a missile
 B-72 (Michigan county highway)
 Paraloid B-72, an ethyl methacrylate co-polymer used commonly in conservation-restoration
 WS-125, a proposed super long range strategic bomber